New Journal of Physics is an online-only, open-access, peer-reviewed scientific journal covering research in all aspects of physics, as well as interdisciplinary topics where physics forms the central theme. The journal was established in 1998 and is a joint publication of the Institute of Physics and the Deutsche Physikalische Gesellschaft. It is published by IOP Publishing. The editor-in-chief is Andreas Buchleitner (Albert Ludwigs University). New Journal of Physics is part of the SCOAP3 initiative.

Abstracting and indexing 
The journal is indexed and abstracted in:

References

External links
 

Open access journals
Physics journals
IOP Publishing academic journals
Publications established in 1998
English-language journals
Online-only journals